L'Art de péter ("The Art of Farting") is a humorous pseudo-medical essay by Pierre-Thomas-Nicolas Hurtaut, published anonymously in 1751. 

The book is subtitled: L’Art de péter, Essai théori-physique et méthodique à l’usage des personnes constipées, des personnes graves et austères, des dames mélancoliques et de tous ceux qui restent esclaves du préjugé.

Editions 
 L'Art de péter, foreword by Franck Évrard, Paris, Maison du dictionnaire, 2007
"Petite Bibliothèque Payot", 2011 (1st éd. 2006) 
 L'Art de péter, Paris, 2011

External links 
 L'Art de péter, Read online
 L’Art de péter on Wikisource

French essays
1751 books
Comedy books